The New Jersey Historical Commission is a government agency of the U.S. state of New Jersey. The mission of the New Jersey Historical Commission is "to enrich the lives of the public by preserving the historical record and advancing interest in and awareness of New Jersey's past."

External links

Official website

Historical Commission
State history organizations of the United States
History of New Jersey